Tall-e Siasat (also Romanized as Tall-e Sīāsat and Tol Sīāsat) is a village in Dorunak Rural District, Zeydun District, Behbahan County, Khuzestan Province, Iran. At the 2006 census, its population was 255, in 62 families.

References 

Populated places in Behbahan County